The 90th Pennsylvania House of Representatives District is located in South Central Pennsylvania and has been represented by Paul Schemel since 2015.

District profile
The 90th District is located in Franklin County and includes the following areas: 

Antrim Township
Greencastle
Mercersburg
Mont Alto
Montgomery Township
Peters Township
Quincy Township
Warren Township
Washington Township
Waynesboro

Representatives

References

Government of Franklin County, Pennsylvania
90